Whitelake is Enter the Haggis's sixth studio album.  It was released in October 2011, and was paid for entirely by Enter The Haggis's fans, through a fundraiser called the Haggis Helper.

The album exhibits a highly matured sound that has broken somewhat away from their Celtic rock roots, but still incorporates influences from various kinds of folk music. There is a wide variety of instruments used on the album, including the trumpet, banjo, bagpipes and cello.

Track listing
1. Headlights I & II - 4:30  
2. The Basket or the Blade - 3:42
3. Devil's Son - 3:36
4. Whistleblower- 3:51 
5. The Flood - 2:58
6. Getaway Car - 4:21 
7. Pseumoustophy - 3:55
8. Follow - 3:57 
9. Of A Murder - 4:48
10. The Hunter and the Phantom Limb - 3:55
11. Let Me Go - 4:47
12. White Squall (Stan Rogers) - 6:17

Personnel
Enter the Haggis
Brian Buchanan - vocals, keyboards, guitar, fiddle, mandolin, accordion, banjo
Trevor Lewington - vocals, acoustic & electric guitar, octave mandolin, banjo
Craig Downie - vocals, bagpipes, whistles, harmonica, trumpet
Mark Abraham - vocals, bass, ukulele
Bruce McCarthy - drums, percussion

Additional Musicians
Michael Olsen - cello on tracks 1, 5, 9
Kelly Elvin - hand claps on tracks 7, 11, gang vocals on tracks 7, 11, 12
Matt Elvin - hand claps on tracks 7, 11, gang vocals on track 7
Glenn Forrester - engineering, producer, additional vocals on track 2, gang vocals on tracks 7, 12, hand claps on track 7
Zach McNees - mixing, engineer
Timothy Abraham - engineer
Chris Shreenan-Dyck - mixing
Leon Zervos - mastering
Joe Stahl - additional trumpet on tracks 9, 11
Megan Lovell - dobro on track 10
Christian Overton - trombone on track 11

References 

2011 albums
Enter the Haggis albums